Ina Mabel Lamason  (2 May 1911 – 30 April 1994) was a New Zealand cricket and field hockey representative.  She was also an international hockey umpire, cricket and hockey administrator, and sports journalist.

Biography
Lamason was born in Palmerston North in 1911. A right-arm off break bowler and right-handed batter, she played in four Test matches in 1947–48 and 1954, captaining New Zealand in two. All her games were against England, and she was never on the winning side, losing both the games she captained. She was the vice captain of the New Zealand team that played its first Test match in 1934-35 but had to withdraw from the match with a pulled leg muscle. She captained the side that toured Australia (no Test matches) in 1938. She played domestic cricket for Wellington. Lamason also represented New Zealand at hockey.

Lamason died in Auckland in 1994.

Awards and honours
In the 1989 Queen's Birthday Honours, Lamason was appointed a Member of the Order of the British Empire, for services to cricket and hockey.

Family
Her husband was Jack Lamason, who played cricket for New Zealand on the 1937 tour of England, but did not play in any of the Tests. They married in Wellington in December 1938.

Her sister-in-law Joy Lamason was a Test cricketer. Ina managed the New Zealand tour to England in 1966. Joy was the manager and Ina the assistant manager of the team that took part in the first Women's Cricket World Cup in England in 1973.

References

External links
 
 
"The Story of Pic: a Pioneer of New Zealand Women’s Cricket" by Tiffany Jenks at NZ Cricket Museum

1911 births
1994 deaths
Cricketers from Palmerston North
New Zealand women cricketers
New Zealand women's Test captains
New Zealand women Test cricketers
Wellington Blaze cricketers
New Zealand Members of the Order of the British Empire
New Zealand female field hockey players
New Zealand field hockey umpires
New Zealand cricket administrators
New Zealand sportswriters
Women sportswriters
20th-century New Zealand women writers
20th-century New Zealand writers
New Zealand women cricket captains
New Zealand women referees and umpires